Beshbuloq may refer to the following places in Uzbekistan:

 Beshbuloq, Qashqadaryo Region
 Beshbuloq, Sirdaryo Region